JP-2 or jp2 may refer to:
Pope John Paul II, pope of the Catholic Church from 1978 to 2005
 JP-2, a type of military jet fuel
 .jp2, the file extension for JPEG 2000 files
 JP-2, a genotype of Phytophthora infestans
 The Lost World: Jurassic Park